Tenure of Office may refer to:

 Academic tenure
 Burrowing (politics), tenure by political contrivance
 Tenure of Office Act (disambiguation)